Manitou Springs is a home rule municipality located at the foot of Pikes Peak in western El Paso County, Colorado, United States. The town was founded for its natural mineral springs. The downtown area continues to be of interest to travelers, particularly in the summer, with many shops and restaurants, as well as a creekside city park. The main road through the center of town was one of the direct paths to the base of Pikes Peak. Barr Trail, which winds its way up Pikes Peak, is accessible from town. The subdivision Crystal Hills was added to the municipality in the 1960s.

The city population was 4,992 at the 2010 United States Census. Students are served by Manitou Springs School District 14 and Manitou Springs High School.

History
General William Jackson Palmer and Dr. William Abraham Bell founded Manitou Springs in 1872, intending the town to be a "scenic health resort". Bell's home, Briarhurst Manor, is open to the public as a fine dining restaurant, which is listed on the National Register of Historic places. In 1876, the town was incorporated. "Manitou Springs has been the quintessential tourist town since the 1870s, when visitors discovered the healing waters the Ute Indians had been drinking for years. Many of the town's mineral springs still function today and the water is free."

Historic district

In 1980, the Manitou Springs Historic District was formed by the Historic Preservation Committee to manage development, renovation and preservation within the town. It is a National Register of Historic Places listing and one of the country's largest National Historic Districts.

Waldo Canyon fire
In June 2012, the entire city was evacuated due to the Waldo Canyon fire nearby. Parts of western Colorado Springs were also evacuated. Manitou Springs did not suffer any fire damage, and the city was under evacuation orders from only 1:30 a.m. Monday until 8 p.m. the same day. There was no fire damage visible from Manitou Springs, and all businesses reopened.

Waldo Canyon flash flood
On the afternoon of August 9, 2013, the city was inundated by a flash flood entering the northern edges of the city via roadways and natural channels as it descended from the flooded-out US Hwy 24. Traffic was stopped in both directions as the highway barriers formed a river drifting several occupied cars down a runoff ditch. The strong current made a path down Manitou Avenue from Cavern Gulch, as well as Canon Avenue, meandering turbulently through streets, homes, businesses, and spillways, damaging 20 homes, 8 of them significantly. The flood water threatened buildings and parking lots along Fountain Creek, and closed a portion of Manitou Avenue, which reopened later that evening.

Geography
Situated directly along U.S. Route 24 just west of Old Colorado City and Cave of the Winds, the town is bordered by Mt. Manitou to the west, Red Mountain to the south, and Englemann Canyon, south and west. It is near  Garden of the Gods, with the same red stone as Red Mountain, and is at the base of Pikes Peak.

Climate
Manitou Springs has a humid continental climate (Koppen: Dfb), categorized by four distinct seasons. Summertime is hot, and wintertime is cool, sometimes cold. Spring and fall are generally very pleasant.

Government
Manitou Springs is a local government and a home rule city located within the Colorado Springs metropolitan area.

City council
Manitou Springs is managed by the elected mayor and six city council members. The mayor is elected to a two-year term. Council members are elected to 4 year, overlapping, terms. Three council members are "at large" members and three members represent one of each of the 3 wards in Manitou Springs. Manitou Springs residents may attend the following meetings or working sessions held each month at the Council Chambers at 606 Manitou Avenue.

City boards and commissions
The Manitou Springs City Boards and Commissions include:
 Business Improvement District sponsors events and promotions to encourage tourism and business within Manitou Springs. It was also formed to "improve the cleanliness, safety, and marketability of the Downtown Historic District."
 Fountain Creek Restoration Committee
 Historic Preservation Commission manages development, restoration and preservation of the Historic District.
 Housing Advisory Board
 iManitou including the Chamber of Commerce, Office of Economic Development and Visitors Bureau.
 Metro Parking District, which operates parking lots.
 Mineral Springs Foundation was organized to "restore, protect and publicize the natural mineral springs".
 Open Space Advisory Committee was formed to acquire open space.
 Park and Recreation Advisory Board is charged with the enhancement and promotion of the local parks and trails.
 Parking Authority Board
 Planning Commission, with the objective of "guiding and accomplishing a coordinated, well adjusted and harmonious development of the City and its environs."
 Urban Renewal Authority Board to oversee the "redevelopment of the east end of Manitou Avenue."

Demographics

As of the census of 2000, there were 4,980 people, 2,452 households, and 1,255 families residing in the city. The racial makeup of the city was 93.98% White, 3.65% Hispanic or Latino, 0.50% African American, 1.06% Native American, 1.12% Asian, 0.12% Pacific Islander, 0.94% from other races, and 2.27% from two or more races.

There were 2,452 households, out of which 22.0% had children under the age of 18 living with them; 40.2% were married couples living together' 8.2% had a female householder with no husband present; and 48.8% were non-families. 38.2% of all households were made up of individuals, and 7.3% had someone living alone who was 65 years of age or older. The average household size was 2.03 and the average family size was 2.73.

In the city, the population was spread out, with 18.6% under the age of 18, 7.2% from 18 to 24, 31.6% from 25 to 44, 32.2% from 45 to 64, and 10.3% who were 65 years of age or older. The median age was 41 years. For every 100 females, there were 94.9 males. For every 100 females age 18 and over, there were 92.5 males.

The median income for a household in the city was $40,514, and the median income for a family was $57,260. Males had a median income of $39,102 versus $24,286 for females. The per capita income for the city was $24,492. About 4.7% of families and 7.9% of the population were below the poverty line, including 4.3% of those under age 18 and 10.1% of those age 65 or over.

Commercial district

Manitou Avenue

Canon Avenue

Ruxton Avenue

Attractions and community events

Attractions
Attractions include:
Cave of the Winds, cave complex; tours given daily
 The Iron Springs Chateau Melodrama Dinner Theater, located on Ruxton Avenue, is a dinner theatre for families and adults.
Manitou Cliff Dwellings, a full-size replica of Anasazi Indian cliff dwellings, as well as a museum. The cliff dwellings were built in the early 1900s, using materials from ruined cliff dwellings in the Four Corners area.
Manitou and Pike's Peak Railway, extending from Manitou Springs to the top of Pikes Peak
Manitou Springs Food Tour
Manitou Springs Heritage Center
Miramont Castle and Manitou Springs Fire Department Museum
Rainbow Falls (aka Graffiti Falls) is a waterfall on Fountain Creek where there is a large amount of colorful graffiti painted on the canyon walls and bridge overpass.
The only two recreational marijuana dispensaries in the county.

Mineral springs and parks
The Springsabouts Walking Tours, a tour of nine of the Manitou Mineral Springs sites offered by the Mineral Springs Foundation. People can also take their own tour of the springs by visiting The Manitou Springs Chamber of Commerce & Visitors Bureau to pick up a free mineral springs brochure, content chart and a sampling cup.
Parks, from east to west along Manitou Avenue, include Schryver Park, Memorial Park, Mansions Park, and Soda Springs Park. Fields Community Park is located on El Paso Boulevard. Seven Minute Gazebo is located behind Mansions and Memorial Parks.
There are a total of eight springs throughout town, each with their own mineral properties.
Manitou Incline, a former incline railway bed that rises over 2,000 feet above Manitou Springs is a popular hiking and fitness activity.

Events
Annual Events include:

January
 The Great Fruitcake Toss
 Historic Speaker series
February
 Mumbo Jumbo Gumbo cook off
 Mardi Gras Parade
 Historic Speaker series
March
 Historic Speaker series
April
 9 News Health Fair
 Historic Speaker series
June
 Colorado Wine Festival
 Garden of the Gods 10 Mile Run
 Clayfest, Potter's competition
 Pikes Peak International Hill Climb
 Summer concert series at Soda Springs Park
July
 July 4 Fireworks
 Ice Cream Social and Pie Baking Contest
 Pikes Peak Cycling Hill Climb
 Summer concert series at Soda Springs Park

August
 Buddy Walk
 Craft Lager Festival
 Pikes Peak Ascent and Marathon
 Mountain Music Festival
 Summer concert series at Soda Springs Park
September
 Commonwheel Arts and Crafts Festival
 Pikes Peak Challenge
 ArtWalk Weekend
October
 Emma Crawford Memorial Coffin Races. 
 Emma's Wake
 Ghost Tours
 Authorfest of the Rockies
November
 MSVFD Turkey Shoot
 Salvation Army Community Dinner
 Victorian Christmas at Miramont
December
 Breakfast with Santa
 Santa at the Town Clock
 Salvation Army Community Dinner

Inns and hotels
 Barker House, (a private Residential Apartment building for many decades) was one of the first hotels in Manitou Springs and due to its long history, Barker House is on the National Register of Historic Places.
 Briarhurst Manor, Victorian manor house built by the founder of Manitou Springs, Dr. William Bell
 Cliff House at Pikes Peak, a small luxury hotel and dining room, on the National Register of Historic Places

Notable people
Matt Carpenter, current resident of the city, the most successful male athlete in the history of the Pikes Peak Marathon, the outright record holder and winner of the marathon on eleven occasions.
Clarence R. Wallace, Brigadier general, USMC; was born in Manitou Springs
Justin Armour, NFL football player for the Buffalo Bills and Denver Broncos played for the High School team. Class of 1991.
Actors George Stults and Geoff Stults attended Manitou Springs High School. Graduated in 1995 and 1993 respectively.

See also

 Manitou Springs Historic District 
 List of Manitou Springs Historic District buildings
 Outline of Colorado
 Index of Colorado-related articles
 Manitou and Pike's Peak Railway
 Pikes Peak

References

Further reading

External links 

 
 Manitou Springs Chamber of Commerce
 Pikes Peak Country Attractions
 CDOT map of the City of Manitou Springs

 
Cities in El Paso County, Colorado
Cities in Colorado
Spa towns in the United States
Pikes Peak
Tourism in Colorado
National Register of Historic Places in El Paso County, Colorado
1888 establishments in Colorado
Populated places established in 1888